Kevin Žižek (born 21 June 1998) is a Slovenian football striker.

References

External links
NZS profile 

1998 births
Living people
Sportspeople from Maribor
Slovenian footballers
Association football forwards
1. FC Nürnberg II players
NŠ Mura players
NK Celje players
Regionalliga players
Slovenian PrvaLiga players
Slovenian expatriate footballers
Expatriate footballers in Germany
Slovenian expatriate sportspeople in Germany
Slovenia youth international footballers